Yellow Lake is located by Wegatchie, New York. The outlet creek empties into the Oswegatchie River. Fish species present in the lake are largemouth bass, black bullhead, northern pike, rock bass, yellow perch, bluegill, and black crappie. There is a state owned carry down located off Yellow Lake Road.

References 

Lakes of New York (state)